Vaiaku is a village located on the southern coast of the island of Fongafale in the atoll of Funafuti in Tuvalu.
 
There are 516 inhabitants in Vaiaku, according to the census of 2002, out of 4,492 for the whole atoll of Funafuti, which is the official capital of Tuvalu.

All the administrative buildings, including the National Bank of Tuvalu, and the only hotel of Tuvalu, Vaiaku Langi Hotel, are located in Vaiaku. It also has Teone Church, which is the only church of the Latin Catholic Mission Sui Iuris of Funafuti. The most prominent building on Funafuti is the Fētu'ao Lima (Morning Star Church) of the Church of Tuvalu.

Climate
Vaiaku has a tropical rainforest climate (Af) with heavy to very heavy rainfall year-round.

See also

References 

Populated places in Tuvalu
Funafuti